Maria Tenazi (née Mariya Aleksandrovna Tadevosyan; 1903–1930) was a Soviet Armenian silent film actress. She was the star of film Zare (1926), the first Armenian film dedicated to Kurdish culture.

Biography 
Mariya Aleksandrovna Tadevosyan was born on May 1, 1903 in Baku, Russian Empire (now Azerbaijan). She attended the N. Petrashevskaya Trade School in Tbilisi, where she studied painting.

Russian film director Vladimir Barsky was traveling and looking for scenic landscapes for Iron Hard Labor, a film about the fight of Georgian laborers for their rights before Russian Revolution in 1917. He was traveling between the small town of Alaverdi and Tbilisi, and on his journey he noticed Tenazi working at a copper foundry. In 1924, director Barsky hired her to act in Iron Hard Labor, her first film, which starred Mikheil Chiaureli and Akaki Khorava. 

In 1925, Tenazi was given the starring role in the Barsky film The Secret of the Lighthouse. Her final film was Shelter of Clouds, she became sick while filming. She died of tuberculosis on her birthday, May 1, 1930 in Kobuleti, Georgian Soviet Socialist Republic (now Georgia), at the age of 27.

Filmography 

 1924 – Iron Hard Labor
 1924 – The Railway
 1925 – The Secret of the Lighthouse, as Aishe, the daughter 
 1926 – Zare
 1926 – The Ninth Wave
 1927 – In the Quagmire as Marusya
 1927 – Shelter of Clouds

See also 

 List of Armenian films of the 1920s

References

External links 

 

1903 births
1930 deaths
Armenian actresses
Armenian silent film actresses
People from Baku
Tuberculosis deaths in Georgia (country)
Soviet film actresses
Soviet silent film actresses
20th-century deaths from tuberculosis